Sadi Mohammad is a Bangladeshi Rabindra Sangeet singer and composer. He is the director of the cultural organization, Rabi Raag.

Education and career
Mohammad completed his bachelor's and master's in Rabindra Sangeet from the Visva-Bharati University.

In 2007, Mohammad debuted as a music composer when he released the album Amakey Khujey Pabey Bhorer Shishirey. He released the albums Srabon Akashey in 2009 and Sharthok Janom Amar in 2012.

Mohammad served as the director of the organization Rabi Raag.

Awards
 Lifetime Achievement Award by Channel i (2012)
 Rabindra Award by Bangla Academy (2015)

Personal life
Mohammad have 9 siblings including Shameem Mohammad and dancer Shibli Mohammad. Their father, Salimullah, was killed during the Liberation War of Bangladesh in 1971.

References

Living people
21st-century Bangladeshi male singers
21st-century Bangladeshi singers
Bangladeshi composers
Visva-Bharati University alumni
Recipients of Bangla Academy Award
Year of birth missing (living people)